Madbouly is a surname. Notable people with the surname include:

 Abdel Moneim Madbouly (born 1921), Egyptian actor, comedian and playwright
 Ahmed Madbouly (born 1994), Egyptian footballer
 Mostafa Madbouly (born 1966), Egyptian politician